The Hangover Part II: Original Motion Picture Soundtrack is a soundtrack to the comedy film of the same name. It was released on May 23, 2011 by WaterTower Music.

Development
WaterTower Music has announced the release of The Hangover Part II: The Original Motion Picture Soundtrack on May 24, 2011. The soundtrack contains 12 songs from the film, along with eight dialogue clips from the film. The Hangover Part II opened worldwide on May 26, 2011. Though the song "Monster", by Kanye West featuring Jay-Z, Rick Ross, Bon Iver and Nicki Minaj, was featured in the film, it does not appear on the soundtrack.

Among the songs included on the album is Ed Helms' version of the Billy Joel song "Allentown", rewritten in the spirit of his popular "Stu’s Song" from the soundtrack of 2009′s The Hangover. Also by Billy Joel is "The Downeaster Alexa". Additional new music includes a song from Danzig, along with music from the Ska Rangers, Kanye West, Mark Lanegan, Deadmau5, Wolfmother and more.

Reception
The Hangover Part II: Original Motion Picture Soundtrack received a positive review from AllTimeSoundtrack.com:

Track listing

Other songs that appear in the film but not on the album:
 "Monster" by Kanye West ft. Jay-Z, Rick Ross, Nicki Minaj, and Bon Iver
 "Pretend" by Ken Peplowski
 "Smokestack Lightin'" by Howlin' Wolf
 "Imma Be" by The Black Eyed Peas
 "Time in a Bottle" by Jim Croce
 "Bangkok Days" by Emir Isilay
 "One Thousand Tears of a Tarantula" by Dengue Fever
 "Turn Around Part 2" by Flo Rida and Pitbull

References

External links
 Official film webs

2011 soundtrack albums
Comedy film soundtracks
The Hangover (film series)
WaterTower Music soundtracks